List of locomotive and multiple unit classes of SNCF. Classes in bold are in use, whilst those in italics have been withdrawn.

Numbering Scheme

Locomotives and Multiple Units 
Vehicle numbers are three to six digits long. The first (not always present) digit indicates the sector in which that vehicle operates:
 1: SNCF Voyages: high-speed services, including the TGV
 2: Intercités: medium-distance services
 4: SNCF Fret: freight operations
 5: Transport Express Régional (TER): urban, local and regional services
 6: SNCF Infra: maintains rail infrastructure, the assets of Réseau ferré de France (RFF)
 7: Departmental use
 8: Transilien: commuter services serving Île-de-France

The next (possibly first) two or three digits of a vehicle's number indicate its class, in loose bands corresponding to the traction and power output of the stock:

 0-9999: DC Electric
 10000-19999: AC Electric
 20000-29999: Dual Voltage
 30000-39999: Triple Voltage
 40000-49999: Quadruple Voltage
 60000-79999: Diesel
The final digits uniquely identify the engine within its class, but in the case of a three digit class number, the engine number may begin adding to the class number (for example, a Class 22200 may have a number beginning 222, 223 or 224).

Multiple units are numbered the same as locomotives, but prefixed by X for DMUs or Z for EMUs. Diesel shunters are prefixed Y. A now discontinued practice was to prefix the class number by the wheel arrangement.

TGV numbering scheme 
Each TGV trainset has its own number, found on the nose. Within the set, each vehicle is given its own number. The power cars are numbered by the standard locomotive numbering scheme, prefixed by TGV. The trailers are given a number which consists of the first two digits of the power car's number, followed by the number of the trailer in the set, and finishing with the number of the trainset, prefixed by TGVR or TGVZR, if powered.

Locomotives

Electric locomotives

DC
 BB 1-80
 BB 100
 BB 200
 BB 300
 BB 325
 2D2 500
 BB 800
 BB 900
 CC 1100
 BB 1300
 BB 1400
 BB 1500
 BB 1600
 2BB2 3200
 2BB2 3300
 2CC2 3400
 1ABBA1 3500
 1ABBA1 3600
 1CC1 3700
 1CC1 3800
 BB 4100
 BB 4200
 BB 4600
 BB 4700
 BB 4730
 2D2 5000
 2D2 5100
 2D2 5200
 2D2 5300
 2D2 5400
 2D2 5500
 CC 6001 (Prototype loco)
 BBB 6002 (Prototype loco)
 BBB 6003 (Prototype loco) (ex-BBB 20003)
 CC 6500
 CC 7000 (Prototype locos)
 BB 7003 (Prototype loco) (ex-BB 15007)
 CC 7100
 BB 7200
 BB 8100
 BB 8500
 BB 8700
 BB 9001-9002 (Prototype locos)
 BB 9003-9004 (Prototype locos)
 2D2 9100
 BB 9200
 BB 9300
 BB 9400
 BB 9600
 BB 9700
 BB 80000
 BB 88500

AC
 BB 10001 (Prototype loco)
 CC 10002 (Prototype loco) (ex-BB 16655)
 BB 10003 (Prototype loco) (ex-BB 15007)
 BB 10004 (Prototype loco) (ex-BB 15055)
 BB 12000 "Monocabine"
 BB 13000 "Monocabine"
 CC 14000 "Monocabine"
 CC 14100 "Monocabine"
 BB 15000
 BB 16000
 BB 16100
 BB 16500
 BB 17000

Dual-voltage
 CC 20001 (Prototype loco)
 CC 20002 (Prototype loco)
 BBB 20003 (Prototype loco)
 BB 20004 (Prototype loco) (ex-BB 16540)
 BB 20005 (Prototype loco) (ex-BB 16028)
 BB 20006 (Prototype loco) (ex-BB 10001)
 BB 20011-20012 (Prototype locos) (ex-BB 22379 and 22380)
 BB 20100
 C 20150
 BB 20200
 CC 21000
 BB 22200
 CC 25000
 BB 25100
 BB 25150
 BB 25200
 BB 25500
 BB 26000 "Sybic"
 BB 27000 "Prima"
 BB 27300 "Prima"
 CC 92000 (Class 92)

Triple-voltage
 BB 30000 (Prototype locos)
 BB 36000 "Astride"
 BB 36300 "Astride"
 BB 37000 "Prima"

Quadruple-voltage
 CC 40100
 BB 47000 "Prima"

Dual-mode (electro-diesel)
 CC 83000

Diesel locomotives

Main-line locomotives
 BB 60000 (Alstom/Vossloh shunters)
  ex (prototype locomotive)
  ex-030.DC.1 and 2 (prototype locomotive)
  ex-040.DB.1, exx-PLM 4.AMD.1 (prototype locomotive)
  ex-040.DC.1, exx-PLM 4.CMD.1 (prototype locomotive)
 BB 60031–60033 ex 040.DM.1 to 3, exx PLM 4.DMD.1 to 3 (prototype locomotives)
 BB 60041 ex 040.DF.1 (prototype locomotive)
 1D1 60051 ex 141.DA.1, exx-PLM 141.AMD.1 (prototype locomotive)
 C 61000 + TC 61100
 BB 61000
 
 BB 62400
 BB 63000
 BB 63400
 BB 63500
 
 CC 65000
 CC 65500
 BB 66000
 BB 66400
 BB 66600
 
 BB 66700
 
 BB 67000
 BB 67200
 BB 67300
 BB 67400
 A1AA1A 68000
 A1AA1A 68500
 BB 69000 (prototype locos)
  (ex-BB 66000 refurbished)
 BB 69400 (ex-BB 66400 refurbished)
 CC 70000 (prototype locos)
 BB 71000
 CC 72000
 CC 72100
 BB 75000 "Prima"
  (former gas-turbine locos)
 040.DA.1, ex  (prototype locomotive)
 262.DA.1, ex PLM 262.AD.1 (prototype locomotive)
 262.DB.1, ex  (prototype locomotive)
 141.DB.1, ex PLM 141.DB.1, exx Nord D1, né Ceinture D1 (prototype locomotive)

Shunting locomotives
 
 
 
 
 
 
 
 
 Y 7100
 Y 7400
 Y 8000
 Y 8400
 Y 9000 (ex-Y 7100 / Y 7400 refurbished)
 
 Y 9200
 
 YBD 12000
 YBE 14000
 YBE 15000
 
  (ex-Y 9100)
  (ex-Y 9200)

Steam locomotives
The SNCF adapted the classification system introduced by the Chemins de fer de Paris à Lyon et à la Méditerranée in 1925. This consisted of a numeric prefix derived from the axle (not wheel) arrangement of the locomotive, a letter for the class, and finally a number for the locomotive with the class. SNCF's adaptations included using the axle arrangement in full, and reversing the class letters of tank locomotives. For example, the SNCF used 040.A., and 242.TA. where the PLM used 4.A., and 242.AT.

Class letters A-N were used for existing designs, letters P onwards for SNCF designs. Others railways' designs taken over after World War II were usually given the letter U (American), W (British), X, Y, or Z (German).

Where locomotives were upgraded or rebuilt, the class letter changed, but not the number. While the Region Nord renumbered all their classes from 1, the remaining 4 regions re-used the last three digits of the old number in the new number.

As there were more classes that available letters of the alphabet, the axle arrangement was prefixed with a digit indicating the owning region: 1 Est (former Est and AL lines), 2 Nord 3 Ouest (former État lines) 4 Sud-Ouest (former Paris-Orleans and Midi lines) 5 Sud-Est (former PLM lines). Region 5 was later split in two, with the southern part becoming 6 Mediterranée

Locomotives transferred from one region to another could change their class letter and numeric suffix.

1. Est 
 021.A, ex Est 441 to 485
 220.A, ex Est 2401 to 2432
 141.TB, ex Est 4401 to 4512
 141.TC, ex Est 141.701 to 141.742

2. Nord 
 231.C, ex Nord 3.1201 to 3.1290
 040.TG, ex Nord 4.2016 to 4.2095
 141.TC, ex Nord 4.1201 to 4.1272
 150.B, ex Nord 5.1201 to 5.1230

3. État 
 040.TA, ex État 40-001 to 40-143
 141.TC, ex État 42-001 to 42-020
 141.TD, ex État 42-101 to 42-140
 140.C, ex État 140-101 to 140-370
 141.B and 141.C, ex État 141-001 to 141-250
 230.B, ex État 230-001 to 230-055, ex État 3701 to 3755
 230.J and 230.L, ex État 230-781 to 230-800
 231.B, ex État 231-011 to 231-060
 231.C/D/E/F/G/H/J, ex État 231-501 to 231-783
 231.997, ex État 231-997 to 231-999, ex Württemberg C

4. PO-Midi 
 040.TA, ex Midi 040.421 to 040.421, ex Midi 421 to 424
 141.TA, ex PO 141.301 to 141.490, ex PO 5301 to 5490
 141.TB, ex PO 141.616 to 141. 740, ex PO 5616 to 5740
 240.TA, ex Midi 240.501 to 240.518, ex Midi 4501 to 4518

5. PLM 
 020.TA, ex PLM 7001 to 7005
 030.TA, ex PLM 3.AT
 030.TB, ex PLM 3.AM, rebuilt from PLM Bourbonnais
 130.TA, ex PLM 130.AT, ex Prussian T9.3
 130.TB, ex PLM 130.BT, ex Prussian T11
 232.TA, ex PLM 232.AT, ex PLM 5301 to 5350
 232.TB, ex PLM 232.BT, ex PLM 5501 to 5545
 040.TA, ex PLM 4.AM
 040.TB, ex PLM 4.BM
 040.TC, ex PLM 4.DM
 242.TA, ex PLM 242.AT
 242.TB, ex PLM 242.BT
 242.TC, ex PLM 242.CT
 242.TD, ex PLM 242.DT
 242.TE, rebuilt from 242.TB
 050.TA, ex PLM 5.AT, ex Prussian T16 and T16.1

SNCF

Multiple units

TGV

 TGV Atlantique
 TGV Duplex
 TGV La Poste
 TGV M
 TGV POS (Paris - Ostfrankreich - Süddeutschland)
 TGV Réseau
 TGV Sud-Est
 TGV-TMST (Trans-Manche Super Train, also known as the Class 373)
 TGV Thalys PBA (Paris-Brussels-Amsterdam)
 TGV Thalys PBKA (Paris-Brussels-Köln/Amsterdam)

Diesel and gas-turbine multiple units

Diesel units metre gauge
 X 200 (Verney)(Blanc-Argent railway)
 X 240 (Blanc-Argent railway)
 X 74500 (Blanc-Argent railway)

Diesel units standard gauge
 X 1500 (ex-Diesel unit T 1500 from ETG)
 X 2100
 X 2200
 X 2400
 X 2700 (RGP)
 X 2720 (RGP)
 X 2770 (RGP)
 X 2800
 X 3000
 X 3400
 X 3500
 X 3600
 X 3700
 X 3800
 X 4200
 X 4300
 X 4500
 X 4630
 X 4750
 X 4790
 X 4900
 X 5500
 X 5800
 X 9100
 X 72500
 X 73500
 X 73900
 X 76500
 X 94750 (Parcels units)
 X 94630 (Cannes-Ranguin)
 X 97150 (A2E)

Trailers
 XR 6000
 XR 6100
 XR 6200
 XR 7300
 XR 7800

Turbotrains
 T 1000 (Turbine unit in ETG)
 T 1500 (Diesel unit in ETG)
 T 2000 (RTG)
 TGV 001

Electric multiple units

DC 3rd-rail units metre gauge
 Z 100 (Cerdagne railway)
 Z 150 (Cerdagne railway)
 Z 200 (Cerdagne railway)
 Z 300 (Cerdagne railway)
 Z 600 (St-Gervais-Vallorcine railway)
 Z 800 (St-Gervais-Vallorcine railway)
 Z 850 (St-Gervais-Vallorcine railway)

DC 3rd-rail units standard gauge
 Z 1200
 Z 1300
 Z 1400
 Z 1500
 Z 5177

DC units
 Z 3600
 Z 3700
 Z 3800
 Z 4100
 Z 4200
 Z 4400
 Z 4500
 Z 4900
 Z 5100
 Z 5300
 Z 5600 (Double-decker)
 Z 7100
 Z 7300 (Z2)
 Z 7500 (Z2)

AC units
 Z 6000
 Z 6100
 Z 6300
 Z 6400
 Z 8000
 Z 11500 (Z2)

Dual-voltage units
 Z 8100
 Z 8800 (Double-decker)
 Z 9500 (Z2)
 Z 9600 (Z2)
 Z 20500 (Double-decker)
 Z 20900 (Double-decker)
 Z 21500
 Z 22500 (Double-decker)
 Z 23500 (Double-decker)
 Z 24500 (Double-decker)
 U 25500 (Light-rail)
 Z 26500 (Double-decker)
 Z 27500
 Z 50000
 Z 55500 and Z 56500
 Z 92050 (Double-decker)

Bi-mode units
 B 81500
 B 82500

References 

 00
 000000
SNCF classes
SNCF classes